Georgios Agrimanakis (born 5 March 1949) is a Greek boxer. He competed in the 1976 Summer Olympics.

1976 Olympic results
Below is the record of Georgios Agrimanakis, a Greek lightweight boxer who competed at the 1976 Montreal Olympics:

 Round of 64: bye
 Round of 32: won by walkover versus Bechir Jilassi (Tunisia)
 Round of 16: lost to Andras Batos (Hungary) by decision, 1-4

References

External links
 

1949 births
Living people
Boxers at the 1976 Summer Olympics
Greek male boxers
Olympic boxers of Greece
Competitors at the 1975 Mediterranean Games
Mediterranean Games bronze medalists for Greece
Sportspeople from Athens
Mediterranean Games medalists in boxing
Lightweight boxers
20th-century Greek people